Lee Ju-yong (born 26 September 1992) is a South Korean footballer who plays as full back for Incheon United on loan from Jeonbuk Hyundai Motors in K League 1.

Career
He was selected by Jeonbuk Hyundai Motors in the 2011 K-League draft and entered Dong-a University. He joined Jeonbuk before 2014 season starts.

Club career statistics
As of 24 April 2021

Honours

Club 

Jeonbuk Hyundai Motors
K League 1 : 2014, 2015, 2019, 2020
AFC Champions League : 2016
KFA Cup : 2020

Asan Mugunghwa
K League 2 : 2018

References

External links 

1992 births
Living people
Association football fullbacks
South Korean footballers
Jeonbuk Hyundai Motors players
Incheon United FC players
Asan Mugunghwa FC players
K League 1 players
K League 2 players
Dong-a University alumni